DLT (Russian:ДЛТ: Дом ленинградской торговли — Dom Leningradskoy Torgovli, "Leningrad Trade House") is a department store in Saint Petersburg, Russia, which as of mid-2012 is set to reopen after a major renovation as a branch of the TsUM chain. DLT is located on Bolshaya Konyushennaya street 21–23 just north of Nevsky Prospekt.

History
The land upon which DLT stands was originally developed in the 18th century and belonged to Artemy Volynsky, a major statesman Peter the Great's era. The Volynsky house occupied No. 21 and a small hotel, the "Volkovskie Nomera", occupied No. 23.

The present structure was purpose-built as a retail store for the officers of the garrison guard. At the time, officers were paid a high salary and were expected to live a lavish lifestyle. Along these lines, the officers' cooperative felt it appropriate that their store should be no less luxurious than the most fashionable Parisian department stores. An architectural competition was held, presided over by famed Austrian architect Otto Wagner, and the German firm Wayss & Freytag was selected to lead the construction. The first phase of the store opened in 1908 as the Dom Gvardeyskava ekonomicheskava obshchestva (Дом Гвардейскаго экономическаго общества), i.e. the "House of the (Garrison) Guard Economic Society", but acquired the nickname Gvardeyskaya Ekonomka (Гвардейская экономка), or "Guards' Discount Shop" due to the discounted prices. In 1912–1913 the second phase was opened.

In 1918 after the revolution, the store was reorganized into offices and the "First State Department Store" (Первый государственный универсальный магазин) . In 1927 this was transformed again into the "House of the Leningrad cooperation LSPO (Leningrad Council of Consumer Societies)" (Дом ленинградской кооперации ЛСПО (Ленинградского совета потребительских обществ)) although often it was called LSD .In the 1930s, it became the "Torgsin" department store, and in 1935 it acquired its present name.

In 2005 the state auctioned off rights to the building to the Mercury company, the leader of the Russian retail market for the sale of luxury goods. From 2005-2012 it underwent renovations in order to open as a branch of TsUm.  The retail area was expanded from 9,000 to 18,000 m2 by adding two more floors.

References

External links 
 

Department stores of Russia
Buildings and structures in Saint Petersburg
Art Nouveau architecture in Saint Petersburg
Art Nouveau retail buildings
Commercial buildings completed in 1913
1913 establishments in the Russian Empire
Department stores of the Soviet Union
Companies nationalised by the Soviet Union
Cultural heritage monuments of regional significance in Saint Petersburg